Holly Muñoz is an American rock and country musician and songwriter based in Austin, Texas.

Early life 
Muñoz was raised in El Paso, Texas and attended college at Macalester College in St. Paul Minnesota with a double major in anthropology and history.

Aviette 
From 2005 to 2009, Muñoz was the lead vocalist and guitarist for Minneapolis based alternative rock band Aviette. They released two albums, and received national radio airplay. Notable achievements of the band also included having two songs appear on the MTV show The Real World, being selected to perform as official showcase artists at the CMJ Music Marathon, and giving a live performance on Minnesota public radio station KCMP, 89.3 The Current.

HOLLY 
After leaving Aviette, Muñoz was commissioned by the Jerome Foundation to compose and perform an improvisational music piece at The Cedar Cultural Center and later relocated from Minneapolis to San Francisco.

A year after landing in California, she left her career as a fundraiser with the San Francisco Symphony with only $2000 in savings to focus on being a full-time musician. Over the course of 20 days, she raised a record-breaking $50,000 using Tilt open to work on a solo album produced by John Vanderslice. The campaign was the largest successful musical campaign on the platform, and seventh largest campaign overall for 2013.

The album, Maps and Lists, was released on September 16, 2014 under the moniker HOLLY and features original album artwork by graphic novelist Anders Nilsen.  After releasing the album embarked on a 45-city tour preceded by album release parties in Minneapolis, San Francisco, and New York City featuring Ken Stringfellow from The Posies, Big Star and R.E.M. She also performed a live set on KEXP-FM in Seattle.

In January 2015, she successfully completed another $50,000 crowd funding campaign to record and release "#2 Record", a double concept album that featured two versions of each song.  One version featured Holly on vocals and the other featured a collaborating artist, including Vanderslice, Stringfellow, Alan Sparhawk (of Low), John Hermanson (of Storyhill and Alva Star), and Brian Tighe (of The Hang Ups).

On March of that year, she and Stringfellow also announced they would be recording a country album together. The album was a concept album based on Willie Nelson's album Red Headed Stranger, and included Vicki Peterson from The Bangles, and Matthew Caws of Nada Surf. It received positive reviews. The Boston Globe commented that it was a " fascinating left-field listen" noting "the gorgeous back-and-forth dueting of Stringfellow and Munoz". Willie Nelson's daughter Amy Nelson also called the album "amazing" on her Instagram feed and thanked them on behalf of the Nelson family.

More recently she has been involved in the creation of an afro-pop group "Ambassadors" together with Dalmar Yare from the group Waayaha Cusub, Martin Dosh and others.

Work with non-profits 
Holly Muñoz co-founded and served on the board of the Mid-Continent Oceanographic Institute (formerly called the Rock Star Supply Company), a non-profit creative writing and tutoring center in the Twin Cities. She also served on the board of Voice of Witness, an organization that uses oral history and education programs to illuminate domestic and international contemporary human rights crises.

Selected discography

Solo 
 Maps and Lists (2014)
 #2 Record (2015)
 #2 Record B-Sides (2015)

with Maelee Whitman 
 Apt. 3E (2003)
 West of Pleasant (2004)

with Aviette 
 Until We Hear From Dave (2006)
 The Way We Met (2008)

with Holly & Ken 
 The Record: A Country Concept Album (2015)

Appearances 
 Adam Svec “Somewhere Under The Rainbow" Enemy Swimmer (2008)
 Al Church “You Came Into My Life” Next Summer (2015)
 The Posies “Titanic" Solid States (2016)

References 

1981 births
Living people
Musicians from the San Francisco Bay Area
American rock guitarists
American women singer-songwriters
Singer-songwriters from California
People from El Paso, Texas
Singer-songwriters from Texas
Macalester College alumni
Crowdfunded albums
Guitarists from California
Guitarists from Texas
21st-century American women singers
21st-century American women guitarists
21st-century American guitarists
21st-century American singers